Big Stone Township is a township in Big Stone County, Minnesota, United States. The population was 253 at the 2000 census.

History
Big Stone Township was organized in 1879. It took its name from Big Stone Lake.

Geography

Cities, towns, villages
 Ortonville (north edge)

Unincorporated town
 Lagoona Beach at 
(This list is based on USGS data and may include former settlements.)

Major highways
  U.S. Route 75
  Minnesota State Highway 7

Lakes
 Bentsen Lake (west half)
 Big Stone Lake (east quarter)
 Deep Lake
 Lysing Lake (south edge)
 Moulton Lake
 Mundwiler Lake
 Olson Lake
 Swenson Lake
 Twin Lakes

Adjacent townships
 Almond Township (north)
 Malta Township (northeast)
 Otrey Township (east)
 Odessa Township (southeast)
 Ortonville Township (south)
 Prior Township (northwest)

Cemeteries
The township contains Big Stone Baptist Cemetery.

Demographics
As of the census of 2000, there were 253 people, 105 households, and 82 families residing in the township.  The population density was 8.4 people per square mile (3.2/km).  There were 183 housing units at an average density of 6.0/sq mi (2.3/km).  The racial makeup of the township was 99.60% White and 0.40% African American.

There were 105 households, out of which 23.8% had children under the age of 18 living with them, 70.5% were married couples living together, 1.9% had a female householder with no husband present, and 21.9% were non-families. 21.0% of all households were made up of individuals, and 10.5% had someone living alone who was 65 years of age or older.  The average household size was 2.41 and the average family size was 2.76.

In the township the population was spread out, with 20.2% under the age of 18, 4.7% from 18 to 24, 21.7% from 25 to 44, 26.5% from 45 to 64, and 26.9% who were 65 years of age or older.  The median age was 49 years. For every 100 females, there were 105.7 males.  For every 100 females age 18 and over, there were 108.2 males.

The median income for a household in the township was $38,750, and the median income for a family was $42,083. Males had a median income of $28,438 versus $23,125 for females. The per capita income for the township was $17,856.  About 3.4% of families and 5.5% of the population were below the poverty line, including 7.1% of those under the age of eighteen and 3.8% of those 65 or over.

References
 United States National Atlas
 United States Census Bureau 2007 TIGER/Line Shapefiles
 United States Board on Geographic Names (GNIS)

Townships in Big Stone County, Minnesota
Townships in Minnesota